Kähkönen is a Finnish surname. Notable people with the surname include:

Heikki Kähkönen (1891–1962), Finnish wrestler 
Jyrki Kähkönen (born 1967), Finnish hurdler 
Kaapo Kähkönen (born 1996), Finnish ice hockey goaltender
Sirpa Kähkönen (born 1964), Finnish novelist and translator
Toni Kähkönen (born 1986), Finnish ice hockey forward
Ville Kähkönen (born 1984), Finnish Nordic combined skier

Finnish-language surnames